Acrolepiopsis sinjovi is a moth of the family Acrolepiidae. It was described by Reinhard Gaedike in 1994. It is found in Russia (it was described from the area of Ussuriysk in Primorsky Krai).

References

Moths described in 1994
Acrolepiidae